Kayo Someya (born 14 May 1991) is a Japanese karateka. She is the 2012 World Champion in the women's kumite 68 kg event and a five-time gold medalist in this event at the Asian Karate Championships.

Career 

She represented Japan at the 2013 World Games held in Cali, Colombia and she won the gold medal in the women's kumite 68 kg event.

At the 2017 World Games held in Wrocław, Poland, she won the bronze medal in the women's kumite 68 kg event.

At the 2018 Asian Karate Championships held in Amman, Jordan, she won the gold medal in the women's kumite 68 kg event. A month later, she won one of the bronze medals in the women's kumite 68 kg event at the Asian Games held in Jakarta, Indonesia. In her bronze medal match she defeated Chao Jou of Taiwan.

At the 2019 Asian Karate Championships held in Tashkent, Uzbekistan, she won one of the bronze medals in the women's kumite 68 kg event. This became the silver medal after a confirmed doping violation of Nodira Djumaniyazova of Uzbekistan, the original gold medalist.

In 2021, she competed in the women's 68 kg event at the World Karate Championships held in Dubai, United Arab Emirates. A month later, she won the gold medal in her event at the Asian Karate Championships held in Almaty, Kazakhstan. She also won one of the bronze medals in the women's team kumite event.

Personal life
She is the older sister of Mayumi Someya, also a karateka and a colleague of Japan's national karate team.

Achievements

References

External links 

 

Living people
1991 births
Place of birth missing (living people)
Japanese female karateka
Karateka at the 2014 Asian Games
Karateka at the 2018 Asian Games
Medalists at the 2018 Asian Games
Asian Games medalists in karate
Asian Games bronze medalists for Japan
Competitors at the 2013 World Games
Competitors at the 2017 World Games
World Games gold medalists
World Games bronze medalists
World Games medalists in karate
21st-century Japanese women